Zlatko Bourek (4 September 1929 – 11 May 2018) was a Croatian-Jewish film director, screenwriter, production designer, cartoonist and expert on Jewish culture.

Bourek was born in Požega. He was raised in Osijek, where he moved at the age of 4, by his Jewish mother and Serbian stepfather. Bourek graduated sculpture and painting at the Academy of Dramatic Art, University of Zagreb in 1955. During his career he made several theater set designs, and had many solo and group exhibitions. He had solo exhibitions in Duisburg, New York, Dubrovnik, Varaždin, Osijek and Zagreb. In 1959, Bourek started doing graphics work and in 1963 he exhibited the paintings that had all the features of his artistic creation, turned to grotesque humor and surrealistic feel of the folk element.

References

Bibliography

 

1929 births
2018 deaths
People from Požega, Croatia
Croatian Jews
Croatian animated film directors
Croatian film directors
Croatian production designers
Croatian screenwriters
Croatian painters
Croatian animators
Jewish painters
Croatian artists
Academy of Dramatic Art, University of Zagreb alumni
Members of the Croatian Academy of Sciences and Arts
Vladimir Nazor Award winners
Burials at Mirogoj Cemetery